The Archibald Lampman Award is an annual Canadian literary award, created by Blaine Marchand, and  presented by the literary magazine Arc, for the year's best work of poetry by a writer living in the National Capital Region.

History 

The award is named in honour of Canadian poet Archibald Lampman (1861–1899). Born in 1861, he graduated from Trinity College (Toronto) in 1882, then moved to Ottawa where he worked for the Post Office until his death in 1899. He is known for his ability to immerse metaphysics in the details of nature, which he observed while hiking round what was then the wilderness capital of a new country. His books include Among the Millet (1888), Lyrics of Earth (1895) and the posthumous Alcyone (1900).

In 2007, the Archibald Lampman Award for Poetry merged with the Duncan Campbell Scott Foundation, creating the $1500 annual Lampman–Scott Award in honour of two great Confederation Poets.  This partnership came to an end in 2010, and competition returned to its former identity as the Archibald Lampman Award for Poetry.

The inclusion of Scott's name in the award has been controversial because of Scott's actions as a Canadian government official supervising Indian affairs for many years. As head of Canada's Indian Affairs agency, Scott promoted the national government's residential school system as a way to assimilate aboriginal children into Canadian society, separating them from their parents and native culture.

The 2003 and 2008 winner of the award, Shane Rhodes, in 2008 turned over half of the $1,500 prize money to the Wabano Centre for Aboriginal Health, a First Nations health centre, according to a 2008 report by the Canadian Broadcasting Corporation. "Taking that money wouldn't have been right, with what I'm writing about," Rhodes said. The poet was researching First Nations history and found Scott's name repeatedly referenced. The CBC reported that Rhodes felt "Scott's legacy as a civil servant overshadows his work as a pioneer of Canadian poetry."
 
In response, Anita Lahey, then editor of Arc Poetry Magazine, said she thought Scott's actions as head of Indian Affairs were important to remember, but did not eclipse his role in the history of Canadian literature. "I think it matters that we're aware of it and that we think about and talk about these things," she said. "I don't think controversial or questionable activities in the life of any artist or writer is something that should necessarily discount the literary legacy that they leave behind."

Winners
 1986 – Colin Morton, This Won't Last Forever
 1987 – Christopher Levenson, Arriving at Night
 1988 – John Barton, West of Darkness
 1989 – Patrick White, Habitable Planets
 1990 – Gary Geddes, No Easy Exit
 1991 – George Elliott Clarke, Whylah Falls
 1992 – Blaine Marchand, A Garden Enclosed
 1993 – Marianne Bluger, Summer Grass
 1994 – John Newlove, Apology for Absence: Selected Poems 1962–1992
 1995 – John Barton, Designs from the Interior
 1996 – Gary Geddes, The Perfect Cold Warrior
 1997 – Diana Brebner, Flora & Fauna
 1998 – Sandra Nicholls, Woman of Sticks, Woman of Stones
 1999 – John Barton, Sweet Ellipsis
 2000 – Stephanie Bolster, Two Bowls of Milk
 2001 – Colin Morton, Coastlines of the Archipelago
 2002 – Armand Garnet Ruffo, At Geronimo's Grave
 2003 – Shane Rhodes, Holding Pattern
 2004 – David O'Meara, The Vicinity
 2005 – Stephen Brockwell, Fruitfly Geographic
 2006 – Laura Farina, This Woman Alphabetical
 2007 – Monty Reid, Disappointment Island
 2008 – Shane Rhodes, The Bindery
 2009 – David O'Meara, Noble Gas, Penny Black
 2010 – Craig Poile, True Concessions
 2011 – Paul Tyler, A Short History of Forgetting
 2012 – Michael Blouin, Wore Down Trust
 2013 – Nina Berkhout, Elseworlds
 2014 – David O'Meara, A Pretty Sight
 2015 – Shane Book, Congotronic
 2016 – Pearl Pirie, the pet radish, shrunken
 2017 – Stephen Brockwell, All of Us Reticent, Here, Together
 2018 - Christine McNair, Charm

See also
Canadian poetry
List of poetry awards
List of years in poetry
List of years in literature

References

External links
Literary Awards in Canada / Prix littéraires au Canada, 1923-2000: Historical and bilingual database which provides brief history of each award together with a complete list of award-winning authors and their works.
Archibald Lampman Award

Canadian poetry awards
1986 establishments in Ontario
Awards established in 1986
Culture of Ottawa
Literary awards by magazines and newspapers